The sculpture of St. Peter of Slivice comes from the Church of St. Peter in Slivice, founded by Jan of Jenštejn, Archbishop of Prague, in 1362. It ranks among early works by the "Master of the Krumlov Madonna" and is exhibited on loan at the permanent collection of the National Gallery in Prague.

Description and context 
The sculpture dates from the period around 1395 and is 91.5 cm tall. It was carved out of golden Prague marlstone and bears traces of polychromy and gilding. The figure lacks its traditional attributes (such as keys), though the fact that it is St. Peter is shown by the typology of the face and the sculpture's original location in the Church of St. Peter. The figure is portrayed in counterpose, with a wealth of drapery that creates deep transverse hollows and vertical pleating, also obscuring the body's proportions. The naturalistic face of an old man and the details of the hands contrast with the hair and beard that are stylised in corkscrew-shaped curls. The individualisation of the face's expression follows on from tombstones by the Parler workshop, though in accordance with the trends of the International Gothic style its expression is more idealised and a sense of resignation is manifested in the posture of the figure. In terms of its type and, for example, the shape of its collar the sculpture has much in common with the figure of St. Bartholomew in the panel painting by a follower of the Master of the Třeboň Altarpiece, the Madonna between SS Batholomew and Margaret (c. 1400).
 
The sculpture of St. Peter represented Czech Gothic art at international exhibitions in Paris and Montreal. It is a typical example of the International Gothic style that is characterised by a tension between idealism and naturalism, and in which form gradually acquires as much meaning as symbolic content. This style has its origin in the Parler workshop at St Vitus Cathedral where corresponding signs can be found in the tombstones of Bohemian kings, in busts in the cathedral's triforium and the sculpture of St. Wenceslas that was probably carved by Heinrich IV. Parler.

The most characteristic material of Prague sculpture production in the late 14th and early 15th century is marlstone, which was mined in quarries at White Mountain and in Přední Kopanina. For a short time after being quarried, marlstone retains its softness and moisture, enabling it to be worked in great detail with carving tools. On the basis of the analysis of material it is possible to determine the Prague origin of numerous sculptures exported from Bohemia to Silesia, Austria and the Rhineland. During the weak rule of Wenceslas IV, it was above all the Archbishop of Prague and leading noble families who commissioned these demanding works of art. Because of their stylised beauty, sculptures of the International Gothic style increasingly became a focus of criticism by church reformers in the period before the outbreak of the Hussite Wars and many fell victim to iconoclasm.

Related works 
 Madonna of Plzeň
 Madona of Krumlov
 Madona of Halstatt
 Madona of Šternberk 
 Moses console, Toruń
 Tombstones by Peter Parler, St. Vitus Cathedral 
 Adoration of the Magi, St. Stephen's Cathedral, Vienna

Notes

References 
 Karl Heinz Clasen: Der Meister der Schönen Madonnen. Herkunft, Entfaltung, Umkreis. Berlin, New York 1974, pp. 116, 234, 235
 Albert Kutal, České gotické umění, Obelisk  Artia, Praha 1972
 Jaromír Homolka, K problematice české plastiky 1350–1450, Umění 11, 1963, p. 429
 Albert Kutal, České gotické sochařství 1350–1450, SNKLU Praha, 1962, p. 88
 Antonín Matějček, Jaroslav Pešina, Česká malba gotická, Melantrich, Praha 1950

External links 
 National Gallery: St. Peter of Slivice, video

Bohemian Gothic sculptures
Cultural depictions of Saint Peter
Sculptures of the National Gallery Prague
Sculptures of popes